Pavlo Khrystiuk (1880 – September 19, 1941) was a Ukrainian cooperator, historian, journalist, political activist, and statesman.

Biography 
Khrystiuk was born in the Kuban Oblast. He studied in Kyiv Polytechnic Institute as his party co-member, Vsevolod Holubovych. He worked for the newspaper Rada (Council). In 1916-17 he also worked for journal "Komashnia". Later in his career were the socialists-revolutionary newspapers "Borotba" and "Trudova Hromada".

He became a member of the Central Committee of the Ukrainian Socialist-Revolutionary Party (UPSR) and the Villagers Association. Also he was a member of the Central Rada and the Rada Minor as well as the Pysar (Scribe) in the General Secretariat of Ukraine. He is the co-author of the Land Reform of January 31, 1918.

He was a Minister of the Internal Affairs in the government of Vsevolod Holubovych (1918) and the deputy Minister in the government of Isaak Mazepa (1919). After the IV Party Congress he was among the members of the central current as Mykhailo Hrushevsky.

From 1919 Khrystiuk emigrated to Vienna, where he was a member of the UPSR "foreign delegation" and worked in the magazine "Boritesia-poboryte!". He returned to Ukraine in 1924 and worked for the Association of scientific and technological workers to influence the socialist construction (Kharkiv, 1928-1931). At that time he was also employed for the Chervony Shliakh newspaper along with Pavlo Tychyna. He was the author of the history of revolution in Ukraine as well as numerous other books on the history of Ukraine.

Khrystiuk was arrested on March 2, 1931 as the member of the Ukrainian National Center and was convicted to imprisonment. He died in one of the camps of the Sevvostlag, Khabarovsk Krai.

Sources 

 Encyclopedia of Ukrainian Studies (in 10 volumes), editor Volodymyr Kubijovyč. "Molode Zhyttia". Paris, New-York, 1954—1989; 
 Minor dictionary of history of Ukraine, editor Valeriy Smoliy. — "Lybid". Kyiv, 1997;
 Padun-Lukyanova, Lesia. Extended name index; 
 Surovtsova, Nadia. Recollections. "Olena Teliha Publishing". Kyiv, 1996.

External links
 
 Chysnikov, V. Energetic and creative person. "Imenem zakonu".

1880 births
1941 deaths
People from Krasnodar
People from Kuban Oblast
Ukrainian Socialist-Revolutionary Party politicians
Interior ministers of Ukraine
State secretary of Ukraine
Ukrainian cooperative organizers
20th-century Ukrainian historians
Ukrainian democracy activists
Kyiv Polytechnic Institute alumni
Soviet people who died in prison custody
Ukrainian people who died in Soviet detention
People who died in the Gulag